She's Crushed (or Crushed) is an American 2010 horror film directed by Patrick Johnson. It depicts the twisted games of love, torture, and death which lay in the hands of Tara, the disturbed intriguing girl next door.

The film was screened at the ShockerFest International Film Festival and The Spooky Film Festival. The film was released on DVD in the United States by Maverick Entertainment Group.

Plot
Easygoing Ray just can not seem to catch a break from his micro-managing boss to his demanding girlfriend. After so much pressure and a little encouragement from a sweet Tara, he engages in a drunken one-night stand. When Tara decides she wants to keep Ray and he decides not to give her what she wants, she makes him pay with his loved ones' lives.

Cast and characters
 Natalie Dickinson as Tara
 Henrik Norlén as Ray
 Robert Paschall Jr. as Phillip
 Hunter Carson as a crazy killer boyfriend
 Keith Malley as Ray's co-worker
 Caitlin Wehrle as Ray's girlfriend

Reception
Dread Central said the film was "far from perfect, schlocky in many ways, I still had a good time watching this one and recommend seeking it out if you like this kind of fun, gory, psycho-stalker stuff."

References

External links
 
 

2010 horror films
American horror thriller films
2010 films
2010s English-language films
2010s American films